The Mignon chocolate egg is an Easter confectionery made by the Fazer company. Its distinctive features are a filling of almond-hazelnut nougat inside a real eggshell. The Mignon is the second oldest Fazer product (only surpassed by the Pihlaja marmalade candy), dating back to 1896, when Karl Fazer brought the recipe from Germany. 

Enduringly popular as parts of Finnish Easter celebrations with ca. two million eggs sold per year, Mignon eggs are handmade at the Fazer factory in Vantaa.

References

Brand name confectionery
Finnish confectionery
Fazer